The McAllen Giants were a minor league baseball franchise based in McAllen, Texas. In 1949 and 1950, the Giants played as members of the Class D level Rio Grande Valley League, hosting home games at Paris Field. The Giants qualified for the 1949 playoffs, before finishing last in 1950, which proved to be the final season of the league.

History
The Giants were preceded by the 1938 McAllen Packers, who played as members of the Class D level Texas Valley League, reforming after a nine–season hiatus.

In 1949, McAllen returned to play in the Rio Grande Valley League, which reformed. The 1931 McAllen Palms won the Rio Grande Valley League championship in the leagues' previous season of play.

The McAllen "Giants" joined the six-team Class D level Rio Grande Valley League, with the Brownsville Charros, Corpus Christi Aces, Del Rio Cowboys, Donna Cardinals and Laredo Apaches beginning league play with McAllen on April 27, 1949. The McAllen Giants were owned by Earl Long.

In their first season of play, the 1949 McAllen Giants qualified for the four-team Rio Grande Valley League playoffs. The Giants placed fourth in the regular season standings, with a record of 70–68, playing the season under managers Fran Matthews and Phil Kuykendall. McAllen finished 18.0 games behind the 1st place Corpus Christi Aces in the final standings. In the playoffs, McAllen was swept in four games by Corpus Christi in the  first round. McAllen pitcher Edward Arthur led the league with 198 strikeouts and teammate Harold Jackson had a 20-8 record, the best in the league.

In 1950, the Rio Grande Valley league became a Class C level league to begin the season, as the league expanded to eight teams. However, the Robstown Rebels and Donna-Weslaco Twins teams folded during the season, leaving six remaining teams. The league would not return to play in 1951.

The 1950 McAllen Giants finished a distant last in the Rio Grande Valley league final standings. With an average player age of 22.7, the Giants were by far the youngest team in the league. The Giants had a final record of 42–102, finishing 42.0 games behind the first place Harlingen Capitols and 33.5 games behind the fifth place Del Rio Cowboys. Managed by Boyd SoRelle and the returning Phil Kuykendall, McAllen did not qualify for the 1950 playoffs.

The Rio Grande Valley league did not return to play in 1951 and permanently folded. McAllen next hosted minor league baseball, with the 1977 McAllen Dusters, who played the season as members of the short lived Class A level Lone Star League.

The ballpark
The McAllen Giants hosted minor league home games at Paris Field. The ballpark had a capacity of 3,000.

Timeline

Year–by–year records

Notable alumni
No McAllen Giants alumni advanced to the major leagues.

References

External links
Baseball Reference

Defunct minor league baseball teams
Professional baseball teams in Texas
Defunct baseball teams in Texas
Baseball teams established in 1949
Baseball teams disestablished in 1950
Defunct Rio Grande Valley League teams
McAllen, Texas